This article details the 2011–12 UEFA Europa League qualifying phase.

All times are CEST (UTC+02:00).

Round and draw dates
All draws held at UEFA headquarters in Nyon, Switzerland.

Matches may also be played on Tuesdays or Wednesdays instead of the regular Thursdays due to scheduling conflicts.

Format
Each tie is played over two legs, with each team playing one leg at home. The team that has the higher aggregate score over the two legs progresses to the next round. In the event that aggregate scores finish level, the away goals rule is applied, i.e., the team that scored more goals away from home over the two legs progresses. If away goals are also equal, then thirty minutes of extra time are played, divided into two fifteen-minute halves. The away goals rule is again applied after extra time, i.e., if there are goals scored during extra time and the aggregate score is still level, the visiting team qualifies by virtue of more away goals scored. If no goals are scored during extra time, the tie is decided by penalty shootout.

In the draw for each round, teams are seeded based on their 2011 UEFA club coefficients, with the teams divided into seeded and unseeded pots. A seeded team is drawn against an unseeded team, with the order of legs in each tie decided randomly. Due to the limited time between matches, the draws for the second and third qualifying rounds take place before the results of the previous round are known. The seeding in each draw is carried out under the assumption that all of the highest-ranked clubs of the previous round are victorious. If a lower-ranked club is victorious, it simply takes the place of its defeated opponent in the next round. Prior to the draw, UEFA may form "groups" in accordance with the principles set by the Club Competitions Committee, but they are purely for convenience of the draw and do not resemble any real groupings in the sense of the competition, while ensuring that teams from the same association are not drawn against each other.

Teams
Below are the 135 teams involved in the qualifying phase, grouped by their starting rounds. Winners of the 35 ties in the third round qualified for the play-off round, along with 26 new entrants and 15 teams dropping down from the Champions League third qualifying round.

First qualifying round
All times are CEST (UTC+02:00).

Seeding

Matches 

|}

Notes
Note 1: Order of legs reversed after original draw.

First leg 

Notes
Note 2: Banants played their home match at Hanrapetakan Stadium, Yerevan as their own Banants Stadium did not meet the UEFA criteria.
Note 3: Narva Trans played their home match at Lilleküla Stadium, Tallinn as their own Narva Kreenholmi Stadium did not meet the UEFA criteria.
Note 4: Rad played their home match at Stadion FK Obilić, Belgrade as their own Stadion Kralj Petar I did not meet the UEFA criteria.
Note 5: Honka played their home match at ISS Stadion, Vantaa as their own Tapiolan Urheilupuisto did not meet the UEFA criteria.
Note 6: ÍF Fuglafjørður played their home match at Gundadalur, Tórshavn as their own Fuglafjørður Stadium did not meet the UEFA criteria.
Note 7: ÍBV played their home match at Hlíðarendi, Reykjavík as their own Hásteinsvöllur did not meet the UEFA criteria.
Note 8: Käerjéng 97 played their home match at Stade Josy Barthel, Luxembourg City as their own Stade um Bëchel did not meet the UEFA criteria.
Note 9: Renova played their home match at Philip II Arena, Skopje as their own Gradski stadion Tetovo did not meet the UEFA criteria.

Second leg 

Shakhter Karagandy won 3–2 on aggregate.

Metalurgist Rustavi won 2–1 on aggregate.

Irtysh Pavlodar won 2–1 on aggregate.

Ferencváros won 5–0 on aggregate.

Flamurtari Vlorë won 4–3 on aggregate.

Dinamo Tbilisi won 5–1 on aggregate.

Spartak Trnava won 4–2 on aggregate.

Qarabağ won 7–0 on aggregate.

Elfsborg won 5–1 on aggregate.

Honka won 2–0 on aggregate.

Varaždin won 6–1 on aggregate.

Tromsø won 7–1 on aggregate.

Häcken won 6–2 on aggregate.

Vllaznia Shkodër won 2–1 on aggregate.

Minsk won 3–2 on aggregate.

Fulham won 3–0 on aggregate.

Paks won 5–0 on aggregate.

Aalesund won 6–1 on aggregate.

Rabotnički won 7–1 on aggregate.

Olimpija Ljubljana won 3–0 on aggregate.

Rad won 9–1 on aggregate.

St Patrick's Athletic won 2–1 on aggregate.

The New Saints won 2–1 on aggregate.

3–3 on aggregate. Glentoran won 3–2 on penalties.

KR won 8–2 on aggregate.

Notes
Note 10: Zeta played their home match at Gradski stadion, Nikšić as their own Stadion Trešnjica did not meet the UEFA criteria.
Note 11: Qarabağ played their home match at Tofiq Bahramov Stadium, Baku as their own Guzanli Olympic Complex Stadium did not meet the UEFA criteria.
Note 12: Fola Esch played their home match at Stade de la Frontière, Esch-sur-Alzette as their own Stade Émile Mayrisch did not meet the UEFA criteria.
Note 13: Nõmme Kalju played their home match at Lilleküla Stadium, Tallinn as their own Hiiu Stadium did not meet the UEFA criteria.
Note 14: Häcken played their home match at Gamla Ullevi, Gothenburg as their own Rambergsvallen did not meet the UEFA criteria.
Note 15: NSÍ Runavík played their home match at Svangaskarð, Toftir as their own Runavík Stadium did not meet the UEFA criteria.
Note 16: Paks played their home match at Stadion Sóstói, Székesfehérvár as their own Stadion PSE did not meet the UEFA criteria.

Second qualifying round
All times are CEST (UTC+02:00).

Seeding

† Winners of the previous round whose identity was not known at the time of the draw. Teams in italics defeated a team with a higher coefficient in the previous round, thus effectively taking the coefficient of their opponent in the draw for this round.

Matches

|}

Notes
Note 17: Order of legs reversed after original draw.

First leg

Notes
Note 18: Rad played their home match at Stadion FK Obilić, Belgrade as their own Stadion Kralj Petar I did not meet the UEFA criteria.
Note 19: Iskra-Stal played their home match at Malaya Sportivnaya Arena (Small Arena), Tiraspol as their own Orăşenesc Stadium did not meet the UEFA criteria.
Note 20: Tauras Tauragė played their home match at S. Darius and S. Girėnas Stadium, Kaunas as their own Vytauto Stadium did not meet the UEFA criteria.
Note 21: Rudar Pljevlja played their home match at Gradski stadion, Nikšić as their own Gradski stadion did not meet the UEFA criteria.
Note 22: Häcken played their home match at Örjans Vall, Halmstad as their own Rambergsvallen did not meet the UEFA criteria.
Note 23: Llanelli played their home match at Parc y Scarlets, Llanelli as their own Stebonheath Park did not meet the UEFA criteria.
Note 24: Differdange 03 played their home match at Stade Josy Barthel, Luxembourg City as their own Stade du Thillenberg did not meet the UEFA criteria.
Note 25: Tirana played their home match at Qemal Stafa Stadium, Tirana as it has a greater capacity than their own Selman Stërmasi Stadium.
Note 26: EB/Streymur played their home match at Gundadalur, Tórshavn as their own Við Margáir did not meet the UEFA criteria.
Note 27: Paks played their home match at Stadion Sóstói, Székesfehérvár as their own Stadion PSE did not meet the UEFA criteria.
Note 28: Željezničar played their home match at Asim Ferhatović Hase Stadium, Sarajevo as it has a greater capacity than their own Stadion Grbavica.
Note 29: Metalurg Skopje played their home match at Philip II Arena, Skopje as their own Stadion Železarnica did not meet the UEFA criteria.

Second leg

Metalurgist Rustavi won 3–1 on aggregate.

Vålerenga won 2–0 on aggregate.

Gaz Metan Mediaș won 2–1 on aggregate.

3–3 on aggregate. Vaduz won on away goals.

Ventspils won 4–2 on aggregate.

Maccabi Tel Aviv won 3–1 on aggregate.

Differdange 03 won 1–0 on aggregate.

Elfsborg won 4–1 on aggregate.

Željezničar won 1–0 on aggregate.

1–1 on aggregate. Aktobe won on away goals.

Häcken won 3–0 on aggregate.

1–1 on aggregate. Qarabağ won on away goals.

Bnei Yehuda won 4–0 on aggregate.

Varaždin won 4–2 on aggregate.

Vorskla Poltava won 5–0 on aggregate.

Sarajevo won 2–0 on aggregate.

Dinamo Tbilisi won 6–2 on aggregate.

AEK Larnaca won 9–0 on aggregate.

Spartak Trnava won 3–1 on aggregate.

Aalesund won 4–3 on aggregate.

Red Bull Salzburg won 4–1 on aggregate.

Anorthosis won 3–2 on aggregate.

Paks won 4–1 on aggregate.

Midtjylland won 8–3 on aggregate.

Lokomotiv Sofia won 3–2 on aggregate.

KR won 3–2 on aggregate.

Thun won 2–1 on aggregate.

Gaziantepspor won 5–2 on aggregate.

ADO Den Haag won 5–2 on aggregate.

Rabotnički won 4–0 on aggregate.

Jablonec won 7–1 on aggregate.

Olympiakos Volou won 2–1 on aggregate.

Westerlo won 1–0 on aggregate.

Fulham won 7–1 on aggregate.

Split won 5–2 on aggregate.

Olimpija Ljubljana won 3–1 on aggregate.

3–3 on aggregate. Śląsk Wrocław won on away goals.

St Patrick's Athletic won 3–2 on aggregate.

Nacional won 3–1 on aggregate.

Austria Wien won 5–0 on aggregate.

Notes
Note 30: Levadia Tallinn played their home match at A. Le Coq Arena, Tallinn as it has a greater capacity than their own Kadrioru Stadium.
Note 31: Sheriff Tiraspol played their home match at Malaya Sportivnaya Arena (Small Arena), Tiraspol as it is located in the same complex as Sheriff Stadium, the club's main stadium.
Note 32: Honka played their home match at ISS Stadion, Vantaa as their own Tapiolan Urheilupuisto did not meet the UEFA criteria.
Note 33: Qarabağ played their home match at Tofiq Bahramov Stadium, Baku as their own Guzanli Olympic Complex Stadium did not meet the UEFA criteria.
Note 34: Gagra played their home match at David Abashidze Stadium, Zestafoni as they don't play at their own city Gagra since the 1992–93 Georgia-Abkhazia conflict.
Note 35: Lokomotiv Sofia played their home match at Vasil Levski National Stadium, Sofia as their own Lokomotiv Stadium did not meet the UEFA criteria.
Note 36: Split played their home match at Stadion Hrvatski vitezovi, Dugopolje as their own Stadion Park mladeži did not meet the UEFA criteria.

Third qualifying round
All times are CEST (UTC+02:00).

Seeding

† Winners of the previous round whose identity was not known at the time of the draw. Teams in italics defeated a team with a higher coefficient in the previous round, thus effectively taking the coefficient of their opponent in the draw for this round.

Matches

{{TwoLegResult|Midtjylland|DEN|1–2|Vitória Guimarães|POR|0–0'|1–2}}

|}
Notes
Note 37: Order of legs reversed after original draw.

First leg

Notes
Note 38: Metalurgist Rustavi played their home match at Boris Paichadze National Stadium, Tbilisi as it has a greater capacity than their own Poladi Stadium.
Note 39: Split played their home match at Stadion Hrvatski vitezovi, Dugopolje as their own Stadion Park mladeži did not meet the UEFA criteria.
Note 40: Differdange 03 played their home match at Stade Josy Barthel, Luxembourg City as their own Stade du Thillenberg did not meet the UEFA criteria.
Note 41: Paks played their home match at Stadion Sóstói, Székesfehérvár as their own Stadion PSE did not meet the UEFA criteria.
Note 42: Željezničar played their home match at Asim Ferhatović Hase Stadium, Sarajevo as it has a greater capacity than their own Stadion Grbavica.

Second legAEK Larnaca won 5–2 on aggregate.Dinamo București won 4–3 on aggregate.2–2 on aggregate. Alania Vladikavkaz won 4–2 on penalties.Aalesund won 5–1 on aggregate.Club Brugge won 4–2 on aggregate.Atlético Madrid won 4–1 on aggregate.Vorskla Poltava won 2–0 on aggregate.Bursaspor won 5–2 on aggregate.Legia Warsaw won 1–0 on aggregate.Rennes won 7–2 on aggregate.3–3 on aggregate. Spartak Trnava won 5–4 on penalties.Dinamo Tbilisi won 6–1 on aggregate.Red Bull Salzburg won 4–0 on aggregate.2–2 on aggregate. Gaz Metan Mediaș won 4–3 on penalties.Helsingborg won 3–1 on aggregate.Stoke City won 2–0 on aggregate.Nacional won 4–2 on aggregate.4–4 on aggregate. Ried won on away goals.Maccabi Tel Aviv won 8–0 on aggregate.3–3 on aggregate. Thun won on away goals.0–0 on aggregate. Śląsk Wrocław won 4–3 on penalties.Young Boys won 5–1 on aggregate.Hapoel Tel Aviv won 5–2 on aggregate.Omonia won 3–1 on aggregate.Olympiakos Volou won 6–0 on aggregate.Rabotnički won 3–2 on aggregate.PAOK won 5–0 on aggregate.Red Star Belgrade won 9–1 on aggregate.AZ won 3–1 on aggregate.Fulham won 2–0 on aggregate.Karpaty won 5–1 on aggregate.Heart of Midlothian won 5–2 on aggregate.Sparta Prague won 7–0 on aggregate.Austria Wien won 4–3 on aggregate.Vitória Guimarães won 2–1 on aggregate.''

Notes
Note 43: Qarabağ played their home match at Tofiq Bahramov Stadium, Baku as their own Guzanli Olympic Complex Stadium did not meet the UEFA criteria.
Note 44: Häcken played their home match at Ullevi, Gothenburg as their own Rambergsvallen did not meet the UEFA criteria.
Note 45: Lokomotiv Sofia played their home match at Vasil Levski National Stadium, Sofia as their own Lokomotiv Stadium did not meet the UEFA criteria.
Note 46: St Patrick's Athletic played their home match at Tallaght Stadium, Dublin as it has a greater capacity than their own Richmond Park.

Play-off round

References

External links
2011–12 UEFA Europa League, UEFA.com

Qualifying rounds
UEFA Europa League qualifying rounds